Sattvic diet is a diet based on foods that contain one of the three yogic qualities (guna) known as sattva. In this system of dietary classification, foods that decrease the energy of the body are considered tamasic, while those that increase the energy of the body are considered rajasic. A sattvic diet is sometimes referred to as a yogic diet in modern literature.

A sattvic diet shares the qualities of sattva, some of which include "pure, essential, natural, vital, energy-containing, clean, conscious, true, honest, wise". A sattvic diet can also exemplify  Ahimsa, the principle of not causing harm to other living beings. This is one reason yogis often follow a vegetarian diet.

A sattvic diet is a regimen that places emphasis on seasonal foods, fruits if one has no sugar problems, nuts, seeds, oils, ripe vegetables, legumes, whole grains, and non-meat based proteins. Dairy products are recommended when the cow is fed and milked appropriately.

In ancient and medieval era Yoga literature, the concept discussed is Mitahara, which literally means "moderation in eating". A sattvic diet is one type of treatment recommended in ayurvedic literature.

Etymology 
Sattva is a complex concept in Indian philosophy, used in many contexts, and it means one that is "pure, essence, nature, vital, energy, clean, conscious, strong, courage, true, honest, wise, rudiment of life".

Sattva is one of three gunas (quality, peculiarity, tendency, attribute, property). The other two qualities are considered to be rajas (agitated, passionate, moving, emotional, trendy) and tamas (dark, destructive, spoiled, ignorant, stale, inertia, unripe, unnatural, weak, unclean). The concept that contrasts with and is opposed to sattva is Tamas.

A sattvic diet is thus meant to include food and eating habit that is "pure, essential, natural, vital, energy-giving, clean, conscious, true, honest, wise".

Ancient literature 

Eating agreeable (sattvic) food and eating in moderation have been emphasized throughout ancient literature. For example, the Tamil poet-philosopher Valluvar insists this in the 95th chapter of his work, the Tirukkural. He hints, "Assured of digestion and truly hungry, eat with care agreeable food" (verse 944) and "Agreeable food in moderation ensures absence of pain" (verse 945).

Yoga includes recommendations on eating habits. Both the Śāṇḍilya Upanishad and Svātmārāma, an Indian yogi who lived during the 15th century CE, state that Mitahara (eating in moderation) is an important part of yoga practice. It is one of the Yamas (virtuous self restraints). These texts while discussing yoga diet, however, make no mention of sattvic diet.

In Yoga diet context, the virtue of Mitahara is one where the yogi is aware of the quantity and quality of food and drinks he or she consumes, takes neither too much nor too little, and suits it to one's health condition and needs.

The application of sattva and tamas concepts to food is a later and relatively new extension to the Mitahara virtue in Yoga literature. Verses 1.57 through 1.63 of Hatha Yoga Pradipika suggest that taste cravings should not drive one's eating habits; rather, the best diet is one that is tasty, nutritious and likable, as well as sufficient to meet the needs of one's body. It recommends that one must "eat only when one feels hungry" and "neither overeat nor eat to completely fill the capacity of one’s stomach; rather leave a quarter portion empty and fill three quarters with quality food and fresh water". The Hathayoga Pradipika suggests ‘‘mitahara’’ regimen of a yogi avoids foods with excessive amounts of sour, salt, bitterness, oil, spice burn, unripe vegetables, fermented foods or alcohol. The practice of Mitahara, in Hathayoga Pradipika, includes avoiding stale, impure and tamasic foods, and consuming moderate amounts of fresh, vital and sattvic foods.

Sattvic foods

Nuts, seeds, and oils 
Fresh nuts and seeds that have not been overly roasted and salted are good additions to the sattvic diet in small portions. Choices include almonds (especially when soaked in water overnight and then peeled), hemp seeds, coconuts, pine nuts, walnuts, sesame seeds (til), pumpkin seeds and flax seeds. Red palm oil is considered to be highly sattvic. Oils should be of good quality and cold-pressed. Some choices are olive oil, sesame oil and flax oil. Most oils should only be eaten in their raw state.

Fruit 

Fruits are an important part of the sattvic diet and all fruits are sattvic. They have a great importance because they contain all necessary nutrients and minerals, also they contain natural and healthy sugar.

Dairy 
Milk must be obtained from an animal that has a spacious outdoor environment, an abundance of pasture to feed on, water to drink, is treated with love and care, and is not pregnant. The milk may only be collected once the mother's calf has its share. Dairy products like yogurt and cheese (paneer) must be made that day, from milk obtained that day. Butter must be fresh daily as well, and raw; but ghee (clarified butter) can be aged forever, and is great for cooking. Freshness is key with dairy. Milk should be freshly milked from a cow. Milk that is not consumed fresh can be refrigerated for one to two days in its raw state, but must be brought to a boil before drinking, and drunk while still hot/warm.

Vegetables 
Most mild vegetables are considered sattvic. Pungent vegetables like hot peppers (rajasic), leek, garlic and onion (which are tamasic) are excluded, including mushrooms, as all fungi are also considered tamasic. Some consider tomatoes, peppers, and aubergines as sattvic, but most consider the Allium family (garlic, onion, leeks, shallots), as well as fungus (yeasts, molds, and mushrooms) as not sattvic. Sweet potatoes and rice are considered highly sattvic. The classification of whether something is sattvic or not is defined largely by the different schools of thought, and – even then – individually, depending on the understanding and needs of practitioners. Sometimes the given nature of certain foods can be neutralised by careful preparation. A practice is to drink freshly made vegetable juices for their prana, live enzymes, and easy absorption.

Whole grains 
Whole grains provide nourishment. Some include organic rice, whole wheat, spelt, oatmeal and barley. Sometimes the grains are lightly roasted before cooking to remove some of their heavy quality. Yeasted breads are not recommended, unless toasted. Wheat and other grains can be sprouted before cooking as well. Some preparations are khichdi (brown or white basmati rice cooked with whole or split mung beans, ghee and mild spices), kheer (rice cooked with milk and sweetened), chapatis (non-leavened whole wheat flat bread), porridge (sometimes made very watery and cooked with herbs), and bread (sprouted grain bread). Sometimes yogis will fast from grains during special practices.

Legumes 
Mung beans, lentils, yellow split peas, chickpeas, aduki beans, common beans and bean sprouts are considered sattvic if well prepared. In general, the smaller the bean, the easier to digest. Preparations include splitting, peeling, grinding, soaking, sprouting, cooking and spicing. Legumes combined with whole grains can offer a complete protein source. Some yogis consider the mung bean to be the only sattvic legume. Convalescent food in ayurvedic diet includes yusha soups made with lentils.

Sweeteners 
Most yogis use raw honey (often in combination with dairy), jaggery, or raw sugar (not refined). Palm jaggery and coconut palm sugar are other choices. Others use alternative sweeteners, such as stevia or stevia leaf. In some traditions, sugar and/or honey are excluded from the diet, along with all other sweeteners.

Spices 
Sattvic spices are herbs/leaves, including basil and coriander.

All other spices are considered either rajasic or tamasic. However, over time, certain Hindu sects have tried to classify a few spices as Sattvic.

Spices in the new sattvic list may include cardamom (yealakaai in Tamil, Elaichi in Hindi), cinnamon (Ilavangapattai in Tamil, Dalchini in Hindi), cumin (seeragam in Tamil, Jeera in Hindi), fennel (soambu in Tamil, Saunf in Hindi), fenugreek (venthaiyam in Tamil, Methi in Hindi), black pepper (Piper nigrum) also known as 'Kali mirch' in Hindi, fresh ginger (ingi in Tamil, Adrak in Hindi) and turmeric (Manjai in Tamil, Haldi in Hindi). Rajasic spices like red pepper (kudaimilagai in Tamil, 'Shimla mirch' in Hindi) are normally excluded, but are sometimes used in small amounts, both to clear channels blocked by mucus and to counter tamas. Salt is good in strict moderation, but only unrefined salts, like Himalayan salt or unbleached sea salt, not iodized salt.

Sattvic herbs 
Other herbs are used to directly support sattva in the mind and in meditation. These include ashwagandha, bacopa, calamus, gotu kola, ginkgo, jatamansi, purnarnava, shatavari, saffron, shankhapushpi, tulsi and rose.

Rajasic (stimulant) foods 

Stimulant foods, also called mutative foods, mutable foods or rajasic foods, are foods that often provoke mental restlessness. They are not completely beneficial, nor are they harmful, to body or mind. Foods that cannot be categorized as either sentient or static are classified in this food group.

These foods are thought by some to cause aggressive and dominating thoughts, especially towards others.

Stimulant foods energize and develop the manipura (navel) chakra and body but do not promote advancement in the higher chakras.

Such foods include: caffeinated drinks such as coffee, tea, cola drinks, energy drinks, brown or black chocolate, ginkgo biloba, spicy food, unfertilized eggs, food that is pungent, very much salty, bitter or is not balanced in taste.

Tamasic (sedative) foods 

Sedative foods, also called static foods, or tamasic foods, are foods whose consumption, according to Yoga, are harmful to both mind and body. Harm to mind includes anything that will lead to a duller, less refined state of consciousness. Bodily harm includes any foods that will cause detrimental stress to any physical organ, directly or indirectly (via any physical imbalance).

They are, however, sometimes necessary during times of great physical stress and pain. They help dull the pain and lower consciousness, allowing the body to repair itself. Such static foods may be deemed necessary in times of war or great distress.

Static foods stimulate and strengthen the lower two chakras, but will not assist in beneficial development of the higher chakras. In fact, they are usually detrimental to the advancement of the higher chakras.

Such foods sometimes include: meat, fish, fertilized eggs, onion, garlic, scallion, leek, chive, mushroom, alcoholic beverage, durian (fruit), blue cheese, opium, and stale food. Food that has remained for more than three hours (i.e., one yām), is according to chapter 17 of the Bhagavad Gita, in the tamasic mode.

Incompatible foods
Incompatible foods (viruddha) are considered to be a cause of many diseases. In the Charaka Samhita, a list of food combinations considered incompatible in the sattvic system is given. P.V. Sharma states that such incompatibilities may not have influence on a person who is strong, exercises sufficiently, and has a good digestive system.

Examples of combinations that are considered incompatible include:

 Salt or anything containing salt with milk (produces skin diseases).
 Fruit with milk products.
 Fish with milk products (produces toxins)
 Meat with milk products
 Sour food or sour fruit with milk products
 Leafy vegetables with milk products
 Milk pudding or sweet pudding with rice
 Mustard oil and curcuma (turmeric)

See also 
 Ayurveda
 Diet in Hinduism
 Jain (Satvika)
 Lacto vegetarianism
 Ital
 Kosher
 Halal

References

External links 

Diets
Yoga
Ayurveda
Vegetarianism